Khewa (Urdu) is a town of Jhang District located on Jhang Chiniot road.

Some Famous PUBG Player belong to kHewa.Mubashir Aslam&Shahid Arif

References

External links 
Peelu: The First Narrator of the Legend of Mirza-SahibaN

Jhang District
Populated places in Jhang District